An accidental death is an unnatural death that is caused by an accident, such as a slip and fall, traffic collision, or accidental poisoning. Accidental deaths are distinguished from death by natural causes, disease, and from intentional homicides and suicide. An accidental death can still be considered a homicide or suicide if a person was the unintentional cause.

For criminal purposes, intentional homicides are usually classified as murder. Exceptions such as self-defense vary by jurisdiction, and in some cases, persons accused of murder have asserted as a defense that the deceased was actually the victim of an accidental death, rather than an intentional act. However, a person who is responsible for the accidental death of another through negligence may still be criminally liable for manslaughter, and civilly liable for wrongful death.  Accidental death and dismemberment insurance and similar insurance policies pay a benefit in the event of accidental death, With these policies it must be demonstrated that a given death is in fact an accident, rather than an intentional suicide or homicide (which might involve insurance fraud).

It has been suggested that the "vast majority of accidents are not really accidents of chance, but rather accidents of folly, negligence, and blatant human misjudgment". The Centers for Disease Control and Prevention reports that in the US in 2015, there were 146,571 "unintentional injury deaths" that year, the fourth leading cause of death. Of those, 47,478 were from unintentional poisoning, 37,757 were from traffic accidents, and 33,381 were from falls. Approximately 500,000 deaths due to drowning are reported annually, worldwide.

In a couple of countries, all accidental deaths (or apparently accidental deaths) are investigated by government bodies, and sometimes a family will do a private investigation. Inquests in England and Wales, for example, are held into sudden and unexplained deaths, and a fatal accident inquiry is performed for accidental death in Scotland. A verdict of "accidental death", in such cases, is returned when there is no contributory factor from an action or omission of the victim ("death by misadventure") or by another person ("unlawful killing").

Deaths during wartime, due to imprecise or incorrect targeting, maybe euphemistically termed collateral damage, or the result of friendly fire.

See also
 Death by misadventure
 List of accidents and disasters by death toll
 Preventable causes of death
 List of unusual deaths
 Manslaughter
 Criminal negligence
 Wrongful death claim

References

 
Causes of death